Miquel Bestard (1592–1633) was a Spanish painter from Majorca.

Notes

1592 births
1633 deaths
People from Mallorca
17th-century Spanish painters
Spanish male painters